Gerry Norquist (born May 29, 1962) is an American professional golfer.

Norquist was born in Portland, Oregon and turned professional relatively late at the age of 26. He played most of his tournament golf in Asia, predominantly on the Asian Tour where he won five titles, and later on the Japan Golf Tour. His five wins on the Asian Tour are the most for an American. His biggest win came in 1999 at the European Tour co-sanctioned Benson and Hedges Malaysian Open, which gave him a two-year exemption on that tour.

Norquist maintained his links with the Asian Tour and was appointed senior vice president in 2006.

He was active on the European Seniors Tour in 2012; playing in 14 events, making the cut 12 times.  His best finish was a tie for 6th at the Taiwan-based Fubon Senior Open.

Professional wins (13)

European Tour wins (1)

1Co-sanctioned by the Asian Tour

Asian Tour wins (5)

1Co-sanctioned by the European Tour

Asia Golf Circuit wins (1)

Other wins (7)
1989 PGA Assistant Professionals Championship (PGA Pacific Northwest Section event)
1990 El Junko Open (Venezuela)
1994 Palm Springs Open (PGA Southern California Section event)
1997 Mercuries Taiwan Masters, Taiwan PGA Championship
2002 Sedona Open (PGA Southwest Section event)
2004 Sedona Open (PGA Southwest Section event)

See also
List of golfers with most Asian Tour wins

References

External links

American male golfers
Asian Tour golfers
European Tour golfers
Japan Golf Tour golfers
PGA Tour golfers
European Senior Tour golfers
Golfers from Portland, Oregon
Golfers from Phoenix, Arizona
1962 births
Living people